The 1957 Victorian Tourist Trophy was a motor race for Sports Cars staged at the Albert Park Circuit in Victoria, Australia on 17 March 1957.
The race was contested over 32 laps, a total distance of 100 miles.
It was the main event at the 17 March race meeting organised by the Light Car Club of Australia and promoted by the Albert Park Motor Race Committee.

The race was won by Doug Whiteford driving a Maserati 300S.

Results

Notes
 Entries: 20
 Starters: 16
 Finishers: Unknown
 Winner's race time: 66 minutes 45 seconds
 Fastest Lap: Doug Whiteford (Maserati 300S), 2 minutes 1.5 seconds (92.5 mph)
 Attendance: 15,000

References

External links
 1957, www.austinhealey100s.com.au via web.archive.org (includes two images from the 1957 Victorian Tourist Trophy

Victorian Tourist Trophy
Motorsport at Albert Park
November 1957 sports events in Australia
1950s in Victoria (Australia)